The men's doubles of the 2021 I.ČLTK Prague Open tournament was played on clay in Prague, Czech Republic.

Pierre-Hugues Herbert and Arthur Rinderknech were the defending champions but chose not to compete this year.

Marc Polmans and Sergiy Stakhovsky won the title after defeating Ivan and Matej Sabanov 6–3, 6–4 in the final.

Seeds

Draw

References

External links
 Main draw

I.ČLTK Prague Open - Men's Doubles
I.ČLTK Prague Open